Opinion polling in the 2010 Brazilian presidential election began as soon as 2008. The main nationwide polling institutes are Datafolha, IBOPE, Vox Populi, and Sensus. From 1 January 2010 to the election day, as required by the electoral law, all polls were registered within the Supreme Electoral Court database.

Election information

The first round of the 2010 Brazilian presidential election was held on October 3, as part of the country's general election, with a second round between the two leading candidates on October 31. That happened because under Brazilian law, if none of the candidates receives more than a half of the valid votes, a run-off is held four weeks after the first round. The leading candidate, Dilma Rousseff, received 46.9% of the first-round vote, thereby making a second round necessary.

In the election, Brazilian citizens eligible to vote chose their successor to then-President Luiz Inácio Lula da Silva, of the democratic socialist/social democratic Workers' Party. According to the Constitution, the president is elected directly to a four-year term, with a limit of two terms. Lula was hence ineligible for a third term, since he was elected in 2002 and re-elected in 2006. The 2010 election marked the first time since the end of the military dictatorship that Lula was not a candidate for the presidency.

Candidates overview
Since the earliest polls for president, former São Paulo Governor José Serra – candidate for the center-right opposition group led by the centrist/Third Way Social Democratic Party – was ahead of Dilma Rousseff, pre-candidate for the ruling center-left bloc led by the Workers' Party. Rousseff, however, increased her popularity greatly, rising from 3% in March 2008 to 30% in March 2010. On the May 8, 2010 poll by Vox Populi, she finally surpassed Serra, achieving 37% of the voting intention.

Another potential candidate for the ruling center-left group was Ciro Gomes from the Brazilian Socialist Party, who lost his comfortable second place in polls to Rousseff in May 2009. After that, he maintained an average of 12% of voting intention. On April 27, 2010, Gomes' party declined to launch his candidacy, instead supporting Rousseff. In the left-wing opposition group, Socialism and Freedom Party's Heloísa Helena was the most likely candidate, but her name was withdrawn from polling after she decided to run for a seat in the Senate for Alagoas. Plínio de Arruda Sampaio was her party's candidate for president. Almost simultaneously, Marina Silva left the Workers' Party and joined the Green Party to run for president. Prior to her candidature, she was well known internationally as a defender of the Amazon Rainforest, but was less known in her native Brazil.

Polls
The results displayed in this article excludes results for spontaneous polls (in which cards with the names of likely candidates are not presented to researched voters), due to the significant number of voters that would vote for Luiz Inácio Lula da Silva. By law, leaders of all stances of the Executive branch can only be re-elected once.

In September, Vox Populi institute began an unprecedented tracking poll for president, which was intended to last for 36 days until October 2.

First round

Second round

Notes

References

External links
 Results of polls in Brazil at Angus Reid Global Monitor official website
  Poll tracker at the Supreme Electoral Court official website
  Poll tracker at UOL Eleições
  Datafolha polls for the 2010 elections
  Vox Populi polls for the 2010 elections
  Results of the CNT/Sensus general search

2010 elections in Brazil
Brazil
Opinion polling in Brazil